The Militia or Militia of China is the militia part of the armed forces of China, other two parts being the People's Liberation Army (PLA) and the People's Armed Police (PAP). The Militia is under the leadership of the Chinese Communist Party (CCP) and serves as an auxiliary and reserve force for the PLA. It is one of the largest militias in the world.

History 

The role of the militia has varied over the years.  During the 1940s the militia served  as a support force for PLA. After 1949 the party consolidated control over the country and used the militia to maintain Law and order in the country and for defense of the borders and coast. 

In the mid-1950s, Peng Dehuai attempted to build the militia as a reserve force. His efforts were thwarted when the party expanded the militia, assigning it duties as an internal security force during the Great Leap Forward. Lin Biao reduced the size of the militia and reemphasized military training in the early 1960s. 

The militia was fragmented during the early years of the Cultural Revolution, but in the 1970s it was rebuilt to support the PLA. The Gang of Four also attempted to build up the urban militia as an alternative to the PLA, but the urban militia failed to support the Gang of Four, when Hua Guofeng and other moderate military leaders deposed them. 

The militia's logistical support of the PLA was essential during the Sino-Vietnamese War. In the 1980s,  Chinese leaders  improved the militia's  capabilities by reducing its size and economic works.

Roles and tasks 
According to Article 22 of the Law of the People's Republic of China on National Defence, the Militia, under the command of military organs, shoulders the tasks of preparations against war and defence operations, and assists in maintaining public order.

According to Article 36 of the Military Service Law of the People's Republic of China, the Militia's tasks are:
 take an active part in the socialist modernization drive and be exemplary in completing the tasks in production and other fields;
 undertake the duties related to preparations against war, defend the frontiers and maintain public order; and
 be always ready to join the armed forces to take part in war, resist aggression and defend the motherland.

The militia is organized into regional militia corps in every theater command of the PLA, which in turn oversee militia divisions and subordinate formations, and is subdivided into specialty militia units. It is overseen by the National Defense Mobilization Commission, which can order the deployment of its personnel during peacetime and wartime contingencies as may be ordered by the Chairman of the Central Military Commission, who is also the General Secretary of the Chinese Communist Party, is overall supreme commander of the armed services of the Republic.

Maritime Militia 

China Maritime Militia (CMM) is a subset of China's national militia. The CMM trains with and supports the People's Liberation Army Navy and the China Coast Guard in tasks including
 safeguarding maritime claims
 protecting fisheries
 logistics
 search and rescue (SAR)
 surveillance and reconnaissance

In the South China Sea, the CMM plays a major role in controversial maritime activities to achieve China's political goals.

Maritime Militia funding and associated paramilitary training led to a reversal of the downward trend of the Chinese commercial fishing fleet. This Maritime Militia fueled expansion has led to an increase in illegal, unreported and unregulated fishing.

See also 

 Maoism
 Mass line
 People's war
 Paramilitary forces of China
 People's Armed Police
 China Coast Guard
 Xinjiang Production and Construction Corps
 National Defense Mobilization Commission under the State Council
 National Defense Mobilization Department of the Central Military Commission

References

External links 
 Official (PRC)
 The Militia, China’s National Defense in 2002 (whitepaper) by the State Council Information Office 
 The Components of the Armed Forces, China Internet Information Center

 Other
 The Militia globalsecurity.org

Military of the People's Republic of China
Paramilitary organizations based in China
China